Ambeodontus almeidai is a species of beetle in the subfamily Cerambycinae.

References

Phlyctaenodini